Katrine Boorman (born 6 August 1960) is an English actress and director of film, television, voice and stage since 1974. She is the daughter of British actor-filmmaker John Boorman.

Biography

Boorman was born to British film director John Boorman and his first wife Christel Kruse Boorman. They had four children, Telsche (died 1997), Daisy, Katrine, and Charley. The family spent the early years of her life in County Wicklow in Ireland, but after John and Christel divorced, the children and the mother left that area, and John remarried and started another family.

Boorman gradually became a greater presence in her father's life as she took parts in his films.

Selected filmography
 Zardoz (1974; uncredited)
 Excalibur (1981)
 Marche à l'ombre (1984)
 Hope and Glory (1987)
 Camille Claudel (1988)
 French Twist (1995)
 Hanging Around (1996)
 Pédale douce (1996)
 Cash in Hand (1998)
 I, Cesar (2003)
 Marie Antoinette (2006)

Television
Jemima Shore Investigates (1983)
Bordertown (1990)

Director and producer
 Boogie Woogie (2009, assistant director and assistant producer)
 Me and Me Dad (2012 documentary, director and producer)

References

Sources

Living people
1960 births
20th-century English actresses
21st-century English actresses
Actresses from County Wicklow
English film actresses
English film directors
English people of Dutch descent
English people of German descent
English expatriates in Ireland
English television actresses
English voice actresses
English video game actresses